Martin Kolomý (born May 26, 1973 in Bruntál) is a Czech rally raid truck driver.

Dakar Rally results

 In progress

References 

1973 births
People from Bruntál
Czech rally drivers
Off-road racing drivers
Living people
Dakar Rally drivers
Rally raid truck drivers
Sportspeople from the Moravian-Silesian Region